Catanduanes is an island province in the Philippines. It may also refer to:
 Catanduanes' languages:
 Northern Catanduanes Bicolano
 Southern Catanduanes Bikol language
 Legislative district of Catanduanes
 Catanduanes State University
 Catanduanes Narrow-mouthed Frog